Kanuparru is a village in Guntur district of the Indian state of Andhra Pradesh. It is located in Nadendla mandal of Narasaraopet revenue division.

Demographics and climate 
The total population  of  Kanaparru is  4102 . Males are 2038 and Females are  2,064 living in 960 Houses. The total area of Kanaparru is 1213 hectares. Kanaparru was built on flat land ringed by hills that are an extension of the Eastern Ghats. The summer months can get exceedingly hot, while winters are mild. Rainfall is due to the monsoon and is concentrated in the months of July-September.

Governance 

Kanaparru gram panchayat is the local self-government of the village. It is divided into 13 wards, and each ward is represented by a ward member.

Education 

As per the school information report for the academic year 2018–19, the village has a total of 10 schools. These include 5 private and 5 Zilla Parishad/MPP schools.

See also 
List of villages in Guntur district

References 

Villages in Guntur district